Rabaulichthys is a genus of fish in the family Serranidae with four species, ranging sizes from 6 to 6.4 cm long, all of which are found in areas including the Western Central Pacific, Western Pacific, Northwest Pacific, and Western Indian Ocean.

Etymology
The genus is named after the town of Rabaul in New Britain, Papua New Guinea, which is best known as the site of a 1942 battle between Japanese and Allied forces in WW2.

Species 
 Rabaulichthys altipinnis Allen, 1984 (Sailfin anthias)
 Rabaulichthys squirei Randall & Walsh, 2010
 Rabaulichthys stigmaticus Randall & Pyle, 1989 (Spotfin anthias)
 Rabaulichthys suzukii Masuda & Randall, 2001

References 

Marine fish genera
Anthiinae
Taxa named by Gerald R. Allen